In mathematics, the theory of fiber bundles with a structure group  (a topological group) allows an operation of creating an associated bundle, in which the typical fiber of a bundle changes from  to , which are both topological spaces with a group action of .  For a fiber bundle F with structure group G, the transition functions of the fiber (i.e., the cocycle) in an overlap of two coordinate systems Uα and Uβ are given as a G-valued function gαβ on Uα∩Uβ.  One may then construct a fiber bundle F′ as a new fiber bundle having the same transition functions, but possibly a different fiber.

An example

We can take as  any of: the real number line , the interval , the real number line less the point 0, or the two-point set . We could say that more formally in terms of gluing two rectangles  and  together: what we really need is the data to identify  to itself directly at one end, and with the twist over at the other end.

Construction
Details in terms of data for an open covering are given as a case of descent.

This section is organized as follows.  We first introduce the general procedure for producing an associated bundle, with specified fibre, from a given fibre bundle.  This then specializes to the case when the specified fibre is a principal homogeneous space for the left action of the group on itself, yielding the associated principal bundle.  If, in addition, a right action is given on the fibre of the principal bundle, we describe how to construct any associated bundle by means of a fibre product construction.

Associated bundles in general
Let  be a fiber bundle over a topological space X with structure group G and typical fibre F.  By definition, there is a left action of G (as a transformation group) on the fibre F.  Suppose furthermore that this action is effective.
There is a local trivialization of the bundle E consisting of an open cover Ui of X, and a collection of fibre mapssuch that the transition maps are given by elements of G.  More precisely, there are continuous functions gij : (Ui ∩ Uj) → G such that 

Now let F′ be a specified topological space, equipped with a continuous left action of G.  Then the bundle associated with E with fibre F′ is a bundle E′ with a local trivialization subordinate to the cover Ui whose transition functions are given bywhere the G-valued functions gij(u) are the same as those obtained from the local trivialization of the original bundle E. 
This definition clearly respects the cocycle condition on the transition functions, since in each case they are given by the same system of G-valued functions.  (Using another local trivialization, and passing to a common refinement if necessary, the gij transform via the same coboundary.)  Hence, by the fiber bundle construction theorem, this produces a fibre bundle E′ with fibre F′ as claimed.

Principal bundle associated with a fibre bundle
As before, suppose that E is a fibre bundle with structure group G.  In the special case when G has a free and transitive left action on F′, so that F′ is a principal homogeneous space for the left action of G on itself, then the associated bundle E′ is called the principal G-bundle associated with the fibre bundle E.  If, moreover, the new fibre F′ is identified with G (so that F′ inherits a right action of G as well as a left action), then the right action of G on F′ induces a right action of G on E′.  With this choice of identification, E′ becomes a principal bundle in the usual sense.  Note that, although there is no canonical way to specify a right action on a principal homogeneous space for G, any two such actions will yield principal bundles which have the same underlying fibre bundle with structure group G (since this comes from the left action of G), and isomorphic as G-spaces in the sense that there is a G-equivariant isomorphism of bundles relating the two.

In this way, a principal G-bundle equipped with a right action is often thought of as part of the data specifying a fibre bundle with structure group G, since to a fibre bundle one may construct the principal bundle via the associated bundle construction. One may then, as in the next section, go the other way around and derive any fibre bundle by using a fibre product.

Fiber bundle associated with a principal bundle

Let π : P → X be a principal G-bundle and let ρ : G → Homeo(F) be a continuous left action of G on a space F (in the smooth category, we should have a smooth action on a smooth manifold). Without loss of generality, we can take this action to be effective.

Define a right action of G on P × F via

We then identify by this action to obtain the space E = P ×ρ F = (P × F) /G. Denote the equivalence class of (p,f) by [p,f]. Note that

Define a projection map πρ : E → X by πρ([p,f]) = π(p). Note that this is well-defined.

Then πρ : E → X is a fiber bundle with fiber F and structure group G. The transition functions are given by ρ(tij) where tij are the transition functions of the principal bundle P.

This construction can also be seen categorically.
More precisely, there are two continuous maps , given by acting with G on the right on P and on the left on F.
The associated vector bundle  is then the coequalizer of these maps.

Reduction of the structure group

The companion concept to associated bundles is the reduction of the structure group of a -bundle . In other words, we ask to identify the image of the associated bundle mapping (which is actually a functor).

Examples of reduction

Examples for vector bundles include: the introduction of a metric resulting in reduction of the structure group from a general linear group GL(n) to an orthogonal group O(n); and the existence of complex structure on a real bundle resulting in reduction of the structure group from real general linear group GL(2n,R) to complex general linear group GL(n,C).

Another important case is finding a decomposition of a vector bundle V of rank n as a Whitney sum (direct sum) of sub-bundles of rank k and n-k, resulting in reduction of the structure group from GL(n,R) to GL(k,R) × GL(n-k,R).

One can also express the condition for a foliation to be defined as a reduction of the tangent bundle to a block matrix subgroup - but here the reduction is only a necessary condition, there being an integrability condition so that the Frobenius theorem applies.

See also 
Spinor bundle

References

Books

Algebraic topology
Differential geometry
Differential topology
Fiber bundles